The 2012 Beach Handball World Championships was a twelve-team tournament in both men's and women's beach handball, held at Muscat, Oman from July 8–13, 2012. It was the fifth edition of the event. Matches were played in sets, the team that won two sets was the winner of a match. When teams were equal in points the head-to-head result would be decisive.

Brazil won both editions, the men and women competition.

Format
The twelve teams were split into two groups of six teams. After playing a round-robin, the three top ranked team advanced to the Main Round. Every team kept the points from preliminary round matches against teams who also advanced. In the main round every team had 3 games against the opponents they did not face in the preliminary round. The top four teams advanced to the Semifinals. The three bottom ranked team from each preliminary round group were packed into one group. The points won against the teams who were also in this group were valid. Every team played three games and after those round there were placement matches from 7th–12th place.

Men
The draw was held on May 14.

Participating nations

Preliminary round

Group A

Group B

Main round (Group C)

Consolation round (Group D)

Placement matches

Eleventh place game

Ninth place game

Seventh place game

Fifth place game

Finals

Semifinals

Third place game

Final

Final ranking

Awards
MVP
 

Topscorer
 

All-star team
Goalkeeper: 
Left wing: 
Pivot: 
Right wing: 
Specialist: 
Defender: 

Fair play award
 
Chosen by team officials and IHF experts: IHF.info

Women
The draw was held on May 14.

Participating nations

Preliminary round

Group A

Group B

Main round (Group C)

Consolation round (Group D)

Placement matches

Eleventh place game

Ninth place game

Seventh place game

Fifth place game

Finals

Semifinals

Third place game

Final

Final ranking

Awards
MVP
 

Topscorer
 

All-star team
Goalkeeper: 
Left wing: 
Pivot: 
Right wing: 
Specialist: 
Defender: 

Fair play award
 
Chosen by team officials and IHF experts: IHF.info

References

External links
Official Site
IHF Men's website
IHF Women's website

Beach World Championships
2012 Beach Handball World Championships
2012 Beach Handball World Championships
Beach Handball World Championships
21st century in Muscat, Oman
Sport in Muscat, Oman